The 2006 Liga Indonesia Premier Division (also known as the Liga Djarum Indonesia for sponsorship reasons) was the 12th season of the Liga Indonesia Premier Division, the top Indonesian professional league for association football clubs.

Due to the effects of the 2006 Yogyakarta earthquake, PSSI and league organizers announced, in a controversial decision, that no teams would be relegated during the season. This was meant to protect PSIM Yogyakarta and PSS Sleman, who withdrew from competition and thus forfeited their remaining matches due to the earthquake.

Teams

Team changes

Relegated from Premier Division 

 Pelita Krakatau Steel
 Persebaya (punished by PSSI)
 Petrokimia Putra
 PSPS

Promoted to Premier Division 

 Persiwa
 PSIM
 Persitara
 Persiter

Stadiums and locations

First stage

West Division

East Division

Second stage

Group A

Group B

Knockout stage

Semifinals

Final

Awards

Top scorers
This is a list of the top scorers from the 2006 season.

Best player
 Maman Abdurrahman (PSIS)

References

External links
Indonesia - List of final tables (RSSSF)

Top level Indonesian football league seasons
Indonesian Premier Division seasons
1
1
Indonesia
Indonesia